The Aruban Workers' Federation (FTA) is a national trade union center in Aruba. It is affiliated with the International Trade Union Confederation.

See also

 List of trade unions

References

Trade unions in Aruba
International Trade Union Confederation
Trade unions established in 1964
1964 establishments in Aruba